Grevenbroich is a town in the Rhein-Kreis Neuss, in North Rhine-Westphalia, Germany. It is situated on the river Erft, approximately 15 km southwest of Neuss and 15 km southeast of Mönchengladbach. Cologne and Düsseldorf are in a 30 km reach. It is notable for having the Frimmersdorf Power Station, which was one of Europe's least carbon-efficient power stations.

City districts
Grevenbroich consists of the urban quarters and villages: 
 Postal code 41515: 
 Allrath, Barrenstein, Elsen, Fürth, Gewerbegebiet-Ost, Laach, Neu-Elfgen, Noithausen, Orken, Stadtmitte, Südstadt
 Postal code 41516:
 Busch, Gruissem, Gubisrath, Hemmerden, Hülchrath, Kapellen, Langwaden, Mühlrath, Münchrath, Neubrück, Neukirchen, Neukircher Heide, Tüschenbroich, Vierwinden, Wevelinghoven 
 Postal code 41517: 
 Frimmersdorf, Gindorf (population 1,817), Gustorf, Neuenhausen, Neurath

In pop culture
Grevenbroich became widely known as home town of comedian Hape Kerkeling's fictional persona Horst Schlämmer.

Twin towns – sister cities

Grevenbroich is twinned with:
 Celje, Slovenia
 Peel en Maas, Netherlands
 Saint-Chamond, France

Notable people
 Vincenz Hundhausen (translator of Chinese literature and Peking University professor)

See also
 
 Frimmersdorf Power Station

References
 Bieg, Lutz. "Literary translations of the classical lyric and drama in the first half of the 20th century: The "case" of Vincenz Hundhausen (1878-1955)." (Archive) In: Alleton, Vivianne and Michael Lackner (editors). De l'un au multiple: traductions du chinois vers les langues européennes Translations from Chinese into European Languages. Éditions de la maison des sciences de l'homme (Les Editions de la MSH, FR), 1999, Paris. p. 62-83. , 9782735107681.

Notes

External links

  

Rhein-Kreis Neuss